Air Alderney Limited is an airline that has, for some years, been projected to serve the island of Alderney, part of the Bailiwick of Guernsey in the Channel Islands. Air Alderney was founded on 31 January 2017, and faced numerous delays in commencing operations.

History

The airline originally acquired permission to operate flights in early 2017, with licenses issued by the States of Alderney effective March 2018. After a series of delays, Air Alderney planned to commence operations in February 2020, however the States of Alderney ruled that the airline's licenses were no longer valid. It has been reported that Air Alderney is intending to work alongside English airline Directflight, which operate regional flights in Shetland, Scotland. The licensing issues were later resolved and the CAA re-issued the required Operating License in late 2021.

Air Alderney currently owns two Britten-Norman BN2B-26 Islander light aircraft. The airline plans to acquire a single Britten-Norman BN2A MkIII Trislander prior to commencing scheduled services in Q4 2022. Working alongside Britten-Norman, the aircraft will be fully refurbished prior to commencing operations.

The airline launched charter operations on 7 February 2022, operating flights between Alderney, Biggin Hill, Shoreham-by-Sea, Lydd, Guernsey and Jersey. In a social media statement Air Alderney indicated that they plan to launch scheduled services in 2022.

Destinations

Fleet
As of March 2022, Air Alderney appeared to have access to the following aircraft:

References

External links

Airlines established in 2017
Airlines of the United Kingdom
Transport in Alderney
Aviation in Guernsey